Jamie Overton (born 10 April 1994) is an English cricketer who plays for Surrey County Cricket Club. He is a right-arm fast bowler who also bats right-handed. He made his debut for Somerset in the 2012 Clydesdale Bank 40 against Surrey. He made his international debut for the England cricket team in June 2022. His twin brother, Craig, plays for Somerset.

Career
Overton began a rise to wider prominence in the cricket world with a hostile spell of bowling in the opening match of the 2012 U-19 World Cup against Australia in Townsville, registering speeds approaching 93 mph (150 km/h) on his way to claiming two top-order wickets via slip catches held by his brother.

On 29 May 2020, Overton was named in a 55-man group of players to begin training ahead of international fixtures starting in England following the COVID-19 pandemic. On 17 June 2020, Overton was included in England's 30-man squad to start training behind closed doors for the Test series against the West Indies.

On 1 August 2020, it was announced that Overton had rejected Somerset's offer of a new contract and had chosen to join Surrey on a three-year contract ahead of the 2021 season. In the same month, during the 2020 Bob Willis Trophy, Overton scored his maiden century in first-class cricket. In September 2020, Overton requested to join Surrey immediately on loan for the remainder of the 2020 season.

In April 2022, he was bought by the Manchester Originals for the 2022 season of The Hundred.

In May 2022, a new initiative by the ECB designed to discover and track the bowling speed of cricketers in first class cricket showed Overton bowling at 90mph. The following month, Overton was added to England's Test squad for the third and final match against New Zealand. He made his Test debut on 23 June 2022, for England against New Zealand.

References

External links
 

1994 births
Living people
English cricketers
England Test cricketers
Devon cricketers
Somerset cricketers
Northamptonshire cricketers
Surrey cricketers
Sportspeople from Barnstaple
Twin sportspeople
English twins